Naach Baiju Naach (transl.: Dance Baiju, Dance) is a 2022 Bhojpuri-Language film written, directed and produced by Lal Vijay Shahdeo. The film is based on the Folk dance of Bhojpuri region, Launda Naach and the status of their performers in the society. The film stars Dinesh Lal Yadav a.k.a. Nirahua, Ravi Jhankal, Pragati Chaurasia and Neetu Pandey.

References

External links
 

2022 films
2020s Bhojpuri-language films